Siobhán Emma Donaghy (born 14 June 1984) is an English-Irish singer and songwriter. She is best known as a founding member of the girl group Sugababes. Donaghy left the Sugababes in 2001 and released her debut solo album, Revolution in Me, in 2003. Her second studio album, Ghosts, was released in 2007 which was met with critical acclaim. Donaghy reformed with Sugababes in 2012.

In 2012, Donaghy and her former Sugababes bandmates, Buena and Buchanan confirmed their reunion. The original trio were not able to release music under the name "Sugababes" as it was still owned by the management company. They instead released music under the new name, Mutya Keisha Siobhan, until they secured the legal rights to the Sugababes name again in 2019.

Early life 
Donaghy was born on 14 June 1984 in London to Irish parents and has two sisters called Beibhinn and Róisín, who works as her make-up artist. She was discovered by former All Saints manager Ron Tom, who went on to manage Sugababes.

Career

1998–2001: Sugababes 

The group was created when Donaghy and Mutya Buena hooked up with Buena's best friend Keisha Buchanan while working together in a studio. Manager Ron Tom decided they were to be a trio and came up with the name "the Sugababies". Within a year they were offered a record contract by London Records and started calling themselves the Sugababes.

Their debut single, "Overload", was a top ten hit in the UK and was nominated for a BRIT Award for "Best Single". It was a top five hit in Germany and New Zealand. The group co-wrote most of the tracks on One Touch, with the help of All Saints producer Cameron McVey. One Touch produced three more top forty singles in the UK: "New Year", "Run for Cover" and "Soul Sound".

According to Donaghy, she left the group because she never got along with Keisha Buchanan, whom she described as a "bully". Donaghy became depressed (eventually being diagnosed with clinical depression) and could no longer be a part of the Sugababes. In an interview with thelondonpaper, Donaghy said: "It's difficult to leave a band and then make sort of a solo career. I left for a very good reason and I've never for a second wanted to go back there." Despite this, Donaghy maintained contact with Buena, saying she was always pleased to see her.

In March 2010, it was reported that Donaghy's former colleague, Mutya Buena, was pursuing legal rights to the Sugababes name. Buena was doing it by herself and only listed Donaghy and Buchanan's names on the documentation to register the Sugababes' name with the EU's trademark office OHIM.

2002–2009: Revolution in Me, Ghosts and hiatus 

Donaghy started writing music with the help of former producer Cameron McVey to help overcome her depression, and began performing under the alias of "Shanghai Nobody", an anagram of "Siobhán Donaghy". In March 2003, Donaghy released the 7-inch vinyl single "Nothing but Song" under this title as she did not want to be known as "the girl who left the Sugababes". For the release of her first commercial single in June 2003, "Overrated" (co-written with McVey and Paul Simm), Donaghy reverted to her given name. "Overrated" peaked at No. 19 in the UK. It was followed by the single "Twist of Fate", which was released in September 2003 and charted at No. 52.

Donaghy's debut album Revolution in Me was released by London Records in September 2003, and entered the UK Albums Chart at No. 117. Working with her on the album were father-son producers and writers Cameron McVey and Marlon Roudette from Mattafix. Each of the twelve tracks on the album were co-written by Donaghy with McVey, Silvio Pacini, Preetesh Hirji, Matt Kent and others.

In 2005, Donaghy appeared as a backing vocalist on the Mattafix album Signs of a Struggle and on the Morcheeba album The Antidote.

Donaghy parted with London Records in a mutual decision with the company. She recorded a second album independently which was picked up by Parlophone, part of the EMI group, which also bought the rights to Revolution in Me. The album's title track, "Ghosts", was released in February 2007 as a 12-inch promotional two-track single with the song "Don't Give It Up". The latter song was given a wider release in April 2007 and peaked at No. 45 in the UK. The second single, "So You Say", was released in June 2007 and peaked at No. 76. A remix of "Don't Give It Up" by Jerry Bouthier is featured on the Kitsuné release BoomBox, released in November 2007.

The album, Ghosts, was also released in June 2007 and peaked at No. 92. Donaghy had said of the release that she wanted commercial success only so that she could continue to make music. She told The London Paper: "I make left field pop music, and it's a difficult genre to be in because it's not straight pop, it's not alternative, and it's quite hard to market. You have to push it and work it." The album was recorded in a small studio near Barneville-Carteret, France with producer James Sanger; other producers/songwriters include Jony Rockstar, Carl McIntosh ("There's a Place"), Ben Ranyard ("12 Bar Acid Blues"), Charles Lucy of Lucy Tuning ("Sometimes") and Marius De Vries.

Donaghy appeared as the character of Mimi, a lead role, in the William Baker-directed production of RENT in London's West End at the Duke of York's Theatre, which opened in October 2007 and ran until February 2008. She said she was "overwhelmed that she got the part and was looking forward to the challenge". In August 2007 she flew to New York to watch RENT on Broadway to get inspiration for her interpretation of her part. This was Donaghy's West End debut. From 2006 to 2011 she worked as a model booker in London.

In a January 2009 interview with the music site We7, Donaghy indicated that there would be no further solo albums released for the time being. "At this point in time I have no further plans to undertake another record of my own. Ultimately, the true nature of the business side of the music industry is enough to keep me away. Nonetheless, if I find myself in the future bursting with ideas and experiences I feel the need to share through music, I will be back," Donaghy stated.

In June 2009, Donaghy was featured on the Square1 single "Styfling" produced by Silvio Pacini. Later in the year, she said in an interview with fashion site ponystep.com that she feels she had "had the break" she wanted from the industry and was currently working on new music but was unsure when it would be finished.

2011–2016: Forming Mutya Keisha Siobhan 

In October 2011, several news outlets reported that the original line-up of the Sugababes would reform. In January 2012, further circulations that the group would reunite were sparked, after both Buena and Buchanan tweeted that they were in the studio with "two other females" and British rapper Professor Green. However, Buena later denied this on Twitter, saying: "No track [with] keisha or professor G he was around tha studio. im jus workin on my stuff @ tha moment. (sic)" Despite this, Scottish singer-songwriter Emeli Sandé confirmed to MTV UK that she had written new songs for Buena, Buchanan and Donaghy, saying: "Yes, that is true. I've written for the original line-up of the Sugababes, which I'm very happy about because I just loved them when they first came out. I loved their sound, it was so cool. It was very different, so I'm happy to kind of be involved in what started the whole Sugababes journey. It sounds amazing." In April 2012, it was reported that the line-up had signed a £1 million record real with Polydor Records. In June 2012, Donaghy confirmed on Twitter that new music would be released, saying: "the soonest it'll be is in 2 weeks. The latest is 10 weeks."

In July 2012, it was officially confirmed that the group had reformed under the name Mutya Keisha Siobhan and were writing songs for a new album under Polydor. The group attended the 2012 Summer Olympics opening ceremony on 27 July 2012 and posted pictures on their official Instagram page, marked Buena, Buchanan and Donaghy's first public appearance together in eleven years. On 6 August the group confirmed they had written two songs with Shaznay Lewis, former member of All Saints. The next day, Siobhan Donaghy tweeted "With the girls in the studio. I think the album is finished!!!" before adding "Whoop!" In an interview with Popjustice in August 2012, Donaghy stated that she had no interest in releasing any more solo material, saying that she felt her 2007 album Ghosts was her best work and didn't see why she needed to release any more material and that she was completely focused on MKS. An album was confirmed by Donaghy in 2016 to be released in early 2017 however this never materialised for unknown reasons.

2019–present: Touring and The Lost Tapes 
In February 2019, Mutya Buena confirmed that a leak of the demos resulted in the album being postponed. Donaghy has a writing credit on the Bananarama song "Love in Stereo" along with Keisha Buchanan, a song that was originally written for MKS's album. In August 2019, Donaghy, Buena and Buchanan reunited for a cover of Sweet Female Attitude's "Flowers", produced by DJ Spoony, as part of his album Garage Classical. The trio is credited as Sugababes, making it the first time since 2001 that Donaghy performs under the name. Sugababes headlined the second day of June 2022's “Mighty Hoopla” festival in Herne Hill, London. On 20 May 2022 it was announced the band would be supporting Westlife on their Dublin leg. They will make a number of further appearances at music festivals over the summer, including Glastonbury, Portsmouth's Victorious Festival and the Margate Pride Festival.

On 3 June 2022, the 2013 Mutya Keisha Siobhan single, "Flatline", was re-released under the Sugababes name. Sugababes announced their 17-date headlining tour, their first in 9 years, on 23 June 2022, starting on 16 October 2022 in Bristol and concluding on 7 November 2022 in Glasgow.
In October 2022, it was announced that the band would support Take That at BST Hyde Park on 1 July 2023 alongside The Script. They later released The Lost Tapes, an album consisting of previously unreleased material. In March 2023 Donaghy appeared as a special guest on ‘Spinning Plates’, a podcast series presented by Sophie Ellis Bextor.

Personal life 
Donaghy married Chris McCoy in 2013 In which her bandmate Keisha Buchanan attended. She gave birth to a son on 13 August 2017. Donaghy gave birth to a daughter in 2020 although she did not confirm this until 2022.

Discography 

 Revolution in Me (2003)
 Ghosts (2007)

Tours

Headlining as Sugababes
Sacred Three Tour 
Sugababes UK Tour 
Sugababes Australian Tour

Other  shows
One Night Only at the O2

Supporting act
Westlife – The Wild Dreams Tour 
Take That – Live at Hyde Park

Awards and nominations 
{| class="wikitable sortable plainrowheaders"
|-
! scope="col" | Award
! scope="col" | Year
! scope="col" | Category
! scope="col" | Nominee(s)
! scope="col" | Result
! scope="col" class="unsortable"| 
|-
! scope="row" rowspan=7|Brit Awards
| 2001
| British Single of the Year
| "Overload"
| 
|
|-
! scope="row" rowspan=2|Capital FM's Awards
| 2001
| Best Kept Secret
| rowspan=2|Sugababes
| 
|
|-
! scope="row" |NME Awards
| 2001
| Best R&B/Soul Act
| 
|
|-
| 2013
| "Flatline"
| 
|-
! scope="row" rowspan=9| Smash Hits Poll Winners Party
| 2000
| Best New Band
| rowspan=3|Sugababes
| 
|
|-

Theatre appearances

References

External links 
 

 
1984 births
Living people
English child singers
Sugababes members
Parlophone artists
English women singer-songwriters
English people of Northern Ireland descent
Singers from London
People with mood disorders
English women pop singers
21st-century British women singers
English Roman Catholics